An Appeal to Reason: A Cool Look at Global Warming is a 2008 book by Nigel Lawson. In it, Lawson claims that, although global warming is happening, the science is far from settled. He opposes the scientific consensus as summarized by the IPCC. He also argues that warming will bring both benefits and negative consequences, and that the impact of these changes will be relatively moderate rather than apocalyptic. The book has been rejected by climatologists, including IPCC authors Jean Palutikof and Robert Watson as unscientific.

The book was published in the UK and the USA in 2008.  It appeared in Spanish translation the following year, published by Gota a Gota, the imprint of the think tank FAES.

Overview
This book is an expansion of a lecture which Lawson gave in 2006 to the Centre for Policy Studies, a think tank with links to the Conservative Party. 
The lecture was called "The Economics and Politics of Climate Change. An Appeal to Reason"  
As explained in the introduction, the aim of the book is to examine each of the dimensions of the global warming issue, including the science, the economics, both from the perspective of long-term forecasting and cost-effectiveness analysis, the politics, and the ethical aspect.
The book begins by arguing that "the science of global warming is far from settled." Although Lawson accepts that warming is real, he questions the validity of global climate models. Specifically, he highlights the lack of falsifiability of their predictions and the fact that all models failed to predict that there has been no further warming between 2001 and 2007. He also questions if indeed the sole cause of the warming is man-made CO2 and how great that contribution is. Lawson raises several issues regarding the IPCC process and its findings, including the hockey stick graph, and criticises the Stern Report. After the introduction, the remainder of the book proceeds under the assumption that the IPCC majority view is correct.

Lawson then examines how much warming will occur and what are the practical consequences over the next hundred years, based on the 2007 IPCC Report (AR4) scenarios and policy recommendations. The next issue analyzed is the importance of adaptation, what he claims is the IPPC’s most serious flaw regarding the impact of global warming, as there is a "systematic underestimation of the benefits of adaptation" and "the most cost-effective way of addressing the likely consequences" as opposed to reducing CO2 emissions. His next criticism regards the Stern Review, which he claims is "at the extreme end of the alarmist camp". He also critiques the Kyoto Protocol and the practical difficulties of reaching a global agreement. Next, he presents an analysis of the different technologies and market alternatives being implemented and available to reduce emissions, concluding with his proposal of a carbon tax across the board, together with the reduction of other taxes to compensate for the extra revenues. The book closes with a discussion about the discount rates used by the IPCC and the Stern Review in their economic analysis, with a more detailed discussion on the latter. The final chapter summarizes the book, ending with a warning about the dangers of the environmental movement, calling it "the new religion of eco-fundamentalism" and claiming that "we appear to have entered a new age of unreason."

Book reviews 
The book has been reviewed by, amongst others, Nature Reports Climate Change, Literary Review, The Guardian, The Spectator, and The Daily Telegraph,.

Scientific judgment 
James Dent reviewed the book in the Royal Meteorological Society's journal Weather. Robert Watson, the former Chair of the IPCC, accused Lawson of selective quotation and not understanding "the current scientific and economic debate". He also wrote in a letter to a newspaper: "Lord Lawson's perspective that the UK and Europe are over-reacting to the threat of human-induced climate change is substantially wrong and ignores a significant body of scientific, technological and economic evidence."

Sir John Houghton reported that "Although Lawson makes some worthwhile critiques of energy policy,... his book is largely one of misleading messages." Lawson ignores or misunderstands the science, brushes off economic analysis by the International Energy Agency, and lumps respected scientists with purveyors of nonsense. Jean Palutikof, one of the authors of a new IPCC report, said: "By the time you get past 2050 the winners become fewer and fewer. By 2100, we will be losing almost everywhere." She also said that Lawson's view was "very wrong" when it came to the availability of water.

Scientists from the Met Office's Hadley Centre responded to Lord Lawson's contention that there has been no global warming since 2000, saying this was due to the La Niña cooling event of early 2007.

See also

References

External links
Lecture on the Economics and Politics of Climate Change - An Appeal to Reason

2008 non-fiction books
2008 in the environment
British literature
Climate change books
Climate change denial
Environmental non-fiction books
Environmentally skeptical books
The Overlook Press books